Untraceable Evidence is a Police Procedural in Hong Kong, produced by TVB. The series had two seasons.

Season 1
Theme Song: Leaving a Scar (留痕) by Edmond Leung

Cast

Bowie Lam as Tsang Ka Yuen (曾家原)
Flora Chan as Pauline Lip Bo Yin (聶寶言) 
Lee San-san as Choi Siu Tong (蔡小棠)
Derek Kok as Cho Chi Yui (曹志銳)
Margaret Chung as Lip Chun Chun (聶津津)
Simon Lo as Tsang Ka Kiu (曾家喬)
Maggie Chan as Lip Bo Yee (聶寶意)

Season 2
Theme Song: Investigate (追究) by Edmond Leung

Cast

Bowie Lam as Tsang Ka Yuen (曾家原)
Flora Chan as Pauline Lip Bo Yin (聶寶言) 
Lee San-san as Choi Siu Tong (蔡小棠)
Margaret Chung as Lip Chun Chun (聶津津)
Simon Lo as Tsang Ka Kiu (曾家喬)
Ellesmere Choi as Wong Ying Kit (王英傑)
Hawick Lau as Yeung Chi Lun (楊志倫)
Gabriel Harrison as Anthony Yuen Tin Ming (袁天明)
Maggie Chan as Lip Bo Yee (聶寶意)

External links
TVB.com 鑑證實錄 

TVB dramas
1997 Hong Kong television series debuts
1998 Hong Kong television series endings